Edward Kleban (April 30, 1939 – December 28, 1987) was an American musical theatre composer and lyricist. Kleban was born in the Bronx, New York City, in 1939 and graduated from New York's High School of Music & Art and Columbia University, where he attended with future playwright Terrence McNally.  

Kleban is best known as lyricist of the Broadway hit A Chorus Line. He and composer Marvin Hamlisch won the 1976 Tony Award for Best Original Score, and he shared the Pulitzer Prize for Drama in 1976 with Hamlisch and three other contributors to the musical. The one-woman Phyllis Newman show, The Madwoman of Central Park West (1979), featured a few tunes with his lyrics.

For several years he worked at Columbia Records, where he produced albums by performers as diverse as Igor Stravinsky and Percy Faith, and the albums for the Off-Broadway musicals Now Is The Time For All Good Men and Jacques Brel is Alive and Well and Living in Paris. 

He was a teacher for many years at the BMI Lehman Engel Musical Theater Workshop.

Death
Kleban died of complications from throat cancer, aged 48, on December 28, 1987 at St. Vincent's Hospital in New York.

Kleban Foundation 
In his will, Kleban established the Kleban Foundation, which grants the annual Kleban Prize in Musical Theatre. The prize is given in the amount of $100,000, paid over two years, to the most promising librettist and lyricist in American musical theatre. The awards are administered by BMI in association with New Dramatists and ASCAP. 

The prize has been given to 63 musical theatre artists over the past 27 years, awarding a total of around $5,000,000. Notable Kleban Prize winners include Jason Robert Brown, Steven Lutvak, John Bucchino, Robert Lopez, Adam Gwon, John Weidman, and Robert L. Friedman.

Kleban Prize Winners:

A Class Act 
His will also granted rights to his collection of unpublished songs to friends Avery Corman and Wendy Wasserstein with the request that they incorporate them into a new musical. Their attempts failed and the rights reverted to Kleban's longtime companion, librettist Linda Kline. Kline sought someone who did not know or work with Kleban, but who would learn about him through the material. She admired previous work of Lonny Price and sought him as a collaborator.

After six years of work, with Price and Kline as co-authors, Price directed and played the role of Ed in A Class Act, a musical biography of Kleban with a score consisting of songs he wrote for numerous unproduced musicals. After a two-month run at the Manhattan Theatre Club, it transferred to the Ambassador Theatre on March 10, 2001 and ran for three additional months.  Almost 14 years after his death, Kleban earned a Tony Award nomination for Best Original Score and Drama Desk nominations for Outstanding Music and Outstanding Lyrics.

References

External links
 EdwardKleban.com
 
 
 Edward Kleban papers, 1960-1986, held by the Billy Rose Theatre Division, New York Public Library for the Performing Arts

1939 births
1987 deaths
American musical theatre composers
Broadway composers and lyricists
Jewish American composers
Jewish American songwriters
Columbia University alumni
The High School of Music & Art alumni
Pulitzer Prize for Drama winners
Tony Award winners
Drama Desk Award winners
20th-century American composers
Deaths from throat cancer
Deaths from laryngeal cancer
20th-century American Jews